Wuxu Airport railway station is a railway station in Jiangnan District, Nanning, Guangxi, China. It is an intermediate station on the Nanning–Pingxiang high-speed railway. The station opened on 5 December 2022.

The railway station is adjacent to Terminal 2 of Nanning Wuxu International Airport. The planned Terminal 3 will be located at the other side of the station.

References 

Railway stations in Guangxi
Airport railway stations in China